Iheb Msakni (born 18 July 1987) is a Tunisian footballer who plays as a midfielder for Étoile Sportive du Sahel. He is the older brother of fellow Tunisian international Youssef.

Honours 
Individual
 Lebanese Premier League Team of the Season: 2014–15

References

External links 
Iheb Msakni  at Etoile du Sahel

1987 births
Living people
Tunisian footballers
Tunisian expatriate footballers
Tunisia international footballers
Association football midfielders
Stade Tunisien players
EGS Gafsa players
Espérance Sportive de Tunis players
Expatriate footballers in Lebanon
Al Ahed FC players
Étoile Sportive du Sahel players
Tunisian expatriate sportspeople in Lebanon
Lebanese Premier League players
2016 African Nations Championship players
Tunisia A' international footballers